Bento Ribeiro is a middle-class neighborhood in the North Zone of Rio de Janeiro, Brazil. It is a suburban area in the vicinity of Marechal Hermes and Oswaldo Cruz and Vila Valqueire, Rio de Janeiro. Bento Ribeiro owes its name to Bento Manuel Ribeiro Carneiro Monteiro, mayor of Rio de Janeiro between 1910 and 1914. It is the birthplace of the professional football player Ronaldo and the place where the famous television host Xuxa lived in her childhood.

References

Neighbourhoods in Rio de Janeiro (city)